The alumni of Missouri University of Science and Technology, or Missouri S&T, include both graduates and non-graduates who have attended the university located in Rolla, Missouri. Missouri S&T was founded as the Missouri School of Mines and Metallurgy (MSM) in 1870, the first technological institution west of the Mississippi River. In 1964, the school's name was changed to University of Missouri–Rolla (UMR) as part of the University of Missouri System, and the most recent name change to Missouri University of Science and Technology took effect in 2008 to "distinguish UMR from the other University of Missouri campuses", among other reasons.

As of fall 2020, Missouri S&T had a total enrollment of 7,645 students (6,086 undergraduates and 1,559 graduate students). The Miner Alumni Association of Missouri S&T serves over 65,000 graduates and former students. The Hasselmann Alumni house was dedicated in 2015 as the home for the Miner Alumni Association and as a venue for campus and community events. It is named for Karl Hasselmann, a 1925 graduate in mining engineering, who had a prominent career in the oil industry. The Havener Center, the multipurpose campus center for student life and activity, is named for entrepreneur Gary Havener, a 1962 graduate in mathematics.

The listed alumni span multiple fields and careers, particularly those concentrated in science, technology, engineering, and mathematics. The creator of Twitter, Jack Dorsey, enrolled at Missouri S&T in 1995 majoring in computer science and mathematics, but transferred out during his junior year to accept a job with the New York-based company Dispatch Management Services after hacking into their computer network and alerting the company chairman of a hole in their software. Many notable NASA astronauts and engineers are graduates from Missouri S&T, such as Sandra Magnus, who was aboard the last American Space Shuttle, and George Mueller, who helped enable the Apollo 11 moon landing. Other S&T alumni have filled leadership positions within state and federal government, and some have become known in athletics and entertainment.

Business

Education

Entertainment and athletics

Government

Military and uniformed services

NASA

Religion

Science and research

References

External links
  official website

Missouri University of Science and Technology
Missouri University of Science and Technology alumni